Prijedor Urije Airport  is a public use airport located near Prijedor, Bosnia and Herzegovina.

See also
List of airports in Bosnia and Herzegovina

References

External links 
 Airport record for Prijedor Urije Airport at Landings.com

Airports in Bosnia and Herzegovina